Zark may refer to:
 An imaginary literary character from the children's adventure story ZARK
 Zarquon, a character in The Hitchhiker's Guide to the Galaxy
 An imaginary planet in Bill Watterson's comic strip Calvin and Hobbes
 7-Zark-7, a robot character in the American animated series Battle of the Planets
 Zark Rifle, a sniper rifle mod for the Unreal Tournament computer game series
 In The Paging Game, what you do with a thing is to zark it. Everybody takes turns zarking.
Zark the Squeezer, protagonist of bara comic collection Zark the Squeezer by artist Rokudenashi.
Mark Zuckerberg